Jacob Scott Pepper (born 8 May 1992 in Newcastle, Australia) is an Australian professional football (soccer) player who currently plays for Edgeworth Eagles FC as a defensive midfielder.

Career

Newcastle Jets
On 18 December 2010, Pepper made his senior debut in a 4–0 loss to Wellington Phoenix. On 14 February 2012 it was announced he had signed a two-year contract extension with Newcastle Jets. Pepper has since cemented his spot in the starting XI with a string of impressive performances towards the backend of the 2011–12 season. This included a brace of goals in a 3–1 win away against a star-studded Melbourne Victory side, and a deserved call-up to the youth international scene.

Western Sydney Wanderers
On 9 June 2015, he was signed by the Western Sydney Wanderers on a 1-year contract. 

On 29 June 2016, Pepper was released by the Wanderers.

Brisbane Roar
In July 2016, Pepper joined Brisbane Roar. Pepper made his Brisbane Roar debut in Roar's Round 1 clash against Melbourne Victory, coming on for Thomas Broich in the 74th minute. The game ended 1–1, after a 96th minute Brisbane equaliser. He spent most of the 2017–18 season as a makeshift central defender due to several injuries at the club, Pepper has started a total of 10 games at centre back so far this season, earning many plaudits for his performances. He left Brisbane Roar in March 2020.

Madura United
After leaving Brisbane Roar, Pepper joined Indonesian club Madura United.

International career
On 7 March 2011 he was selected to represent the Australia Olympic football team in an Asian Olympic Qualifier match against Iraq.

Career statistics

References

External links
 Newcastle Jets profile

1992 births
Living people
Australian soccer players
Australian expatriate soccer players 
A-League Men players
Liga 1 (Indonesia) players
Newcastle Jets FC players
Western Sydney Wanderers FC players
Brisbane Roar FC players
Madura United F.C. players
Expatriate footballers in Indonesia
Australian expatriate sportspeople in Indonesia
Sportspeople from Newcastle, New South Wales
Association football midfielders
New South Wales Institute of Sport alumni